Young Törless is a 1966 German film directed by Volker Schlöndorff, adapted from the autobiographical novel The Confusions of Young Törless by Robert Musil. It deals with the violent, sadistic and homoerotic tendencies of a group of boys at an Austrian military academy at the beginning of the 20th century.

Plot
At the beginning of the 20th century, Thomas Törless (Mathieu Carrière) arrives at the academy and learns how Anselm von Basini (Marian Seidowsky) has been caught stealing by fellow student Reiting (Fred Dietz). Basini is obliged to become Reiting's "slave," bowing to Reiting's sadistic rituals. Törless follows their relationship with intellectual interest but without emotional involvement.

Also partaking in these sessions is Beineberg (Bernd Tischer), with whom Törless visits Bozena (Barbara Steele), the local prostitute. Again, Törless is aloof and more intrigued than excited by the woman.

He is however very eager to understand imaginary numbers, which are mentioned in his maths lesson. The maths teacher is unwilling or unable to explain what these are, stating that in life, emotion is what rules everything - even mathematics.

After Basini is humiliated and suspended upside down in the school gym because of one of Reiting's intrigues, Törless realises intellectually that the other boys are simply cruel. He seems no more or less emotionally moved by this than by the revelation that he cannot understand imaginary numbers. He decides that he does not want to partake in cruelty, so decides to leave the academy. His teachers think that he is too "highly strung" for his own good, and do not want him to stay anyway - they are part of the system which can allow such terrible things to be done to the weak and vulnerable.

At the end of the film, Törless is dismissed from the school and leaves with his mother, smiling.

Cast
 Mathieu Carrière - Thomas Törless
 Marian Seidowsky - Anselm von Basini
 Bernd Tischer - Beineberg
 Fred Dietz - Reiting
 Lotte Ledl - Gastwirtin / Innkeeper
 Jean Launay - Mathematiklehrer / Maths Teacher
 Barbara Steele - Bozena

Music
The film's significance as a cultural artifact of German post-World War II introspection is enhanced by the fact that its haunting medieval-sounding score was written by Hans Werner Henze, the German modernist composer. Henze, who came of age during the war, was prominent enough in this introspection by virtue of his left-political activism in the arts to feel driven to expatriation from Germany. Hans Werner Henze later arranged a suite from the original score, which was entitled Fantasia for Strings.

Release and awards
Young Törless was screened on 9 May 1966 at the Cannes Film Festival. The film won the FIPRESCI Prize at the 1966 Cannes Film Festival. It was also selected as the German entry for the Best Foreign Language Film at the 39th Academy Awards, but was not accepted as a nominee.

See also
 List of submissions to the 39th Academy Awards for Best Foreign Language Film
 List of German submissions for the Academy Award for Best Foreign Language Film

References

External links
 
 
Young Törless an essay by Timothy Corrigan at the Criterion Collection

1966 films
1966 drama films
1966 LGBT-related films
German drama films
German LGBT-related films
West German films
1960s German-language films
German black-and-white films
Films directed by Volker Schlöndorff
Films based on Austrian novels
Films set in Austria
Films set in the 1900s
Films set in boarding schools
1966 directorial debut films
1960s German films